The Johannesburg Regiment is an infantry regiment of the South African Army. As a reserve unit, it has a status roughly equivalent to that of a British Army Reserve or United States Army National Guard unit.

History

Origins as Artillery
Johannesburg Regiment has been in existence since 1 July 1951. At the time it was an Artillery unit known as 8 Field Regiment South African Artillery. Colonel J. S. K. Brink was the Regiment's first commanding officer and following his retirement he became its honorary colonel. The Regiment's Headquarters were originally based at Auckland Park, where the current SABC offices are situated.

Re-mustered to Infantry
In February 1960, 8 Field Regiment disbanded and the unit officially became known as Johannesburg Regiment and was re mustered as an Infantry Regiment.

Regiment colours
In May 1962 the Johannesburg Municipality agreed that the Regiment could use the Municipal Coat of Arms as their Unit Emblem. Some minor changes were however done to the coat of arms, namely, the two sable antelope that acted as the supporters being replaced with two F.N. Rifles to give it a military touch. With this, the Regiment made history by being the first unit that used an F.N. Rifle in its armorial bearings. A badge that consists only of the shield, was also included.
The motto is on a braid in Latin wording “Fortiter Et Recte” which means “With Valour and Justice”.
The official Colour presentation parade was held at the Milnerpark Showgrounds stadium on 26 February 1966.

Operations
The Regiment mobilised for the first time in 1960 and saw initial service in Bloemfontein, Vereeniging and Sasolburg.

The Johannesburg Regiment has been actively involved in continuous and operational service since its founding in 1960.

Converted to Mechanised Infantry
The Regiment achieved a pinnacle in its history, becoming one of the first then citizen force units to be converted from a motorized to a mechanized unit in 1980 – the achievement occurred as the Regiment was voted the best unit in 72 Brigade on various evaluations during the year.

Subsequent successes include amongst others the following operations/ exercises:
Madimbo, Savannah, Caterpillar, Protea, Thunder Chariot, Ops Eardrum, Ops Paal, Excalibur 1&2, Eagle Hill, Kwiksilwer, Vincity and Southern Cross.

Peace keeping
The Regiment has also successfully participated in peace operations in Africa.

In 2005 Johannesburg Regiment again made history when it provided troops for the first Reserve Company to be deployed in Peace Support Operations in the Democratic Republic of Congo (DRC).

Freedom of the City
In November 1964 the City Council presented the Regiment with their Colours and six years later bestowed on it the honour of Freedom of Entrance to the city of Johannesburg. This was largely due to the efforts of Councillor J. D. Opperman who became the unit's Honorary Colonel in 1979 until he died on 20 April 2000. The Unit Colours were officially handed over on 26 February 1966. National Colours were awarded to the Unit on 5 October 1991, and laid up in April 1994.

The Regiment today

Current command structure
Honorary Colonel	: Col John Wilson 
Chaplain		: Cpln Shadrack Ditabeng Kgonothi
RSM		: CWO B C Masombuka
Second-in-Command: Acting 2IC
Officer Commanding: Lt. Col. JN Nkosi

Unit strengths
The Regiment is an active Regiment, with strong ties between the Unit, Sister Regiments and Higher HQ. The current senior structure is a well drilled, competent unit, and all incumbents have committed to staying on until proper succession planning can kick in. Currently the unit is actively recruiting and training. The unit is supported by a strong, active Association and a widespread network of old boys. The Unit is also settled in proper Headquarters, and has the services of a permanent clerical assistant.

General activities
The unit hosts a parade annually on the first Sunday in March. Traditionally this takes place in Johannesburg, as the Regiment has Freedom of Entry to the City. This parade also serves to commemorate the birthday of the Regiment, and is dedicated to the memory of all members of the regiment that has paid the highest price in defence of our country. A medal parade is also planned for annually, but is only held when applicable. The Regiment also participates in the annual "Poppy Day" parade in November. This event is always well supported by the regiment, as well as the Association.

The Association hosts a Semi Formal dinner annually. An annual golf day fund raiser rounds off the ongoing activities.

The Association also supports the Military Associations of Gauteng, and one of the highlights every year is the MAG picnic at the War Museum. the Associations meets once a months and the main purpose is still to support the Regiment.

Regimental symbols 
In May 1962 the Johannesburg City Council gave permission to the unit to use the Johannesburg City Coat of Arms as the Regimental badge. The cap badge shows minor differences to the original, as the antelope supporting the shield was substituted with 2 F. N. Rifles. The lapel badge consists of the shield portion of the cap badge. The motto is in Latin: "FORTITER ET RECTE" loosely translated this means: With Valour and Justice.

Previous dress insignia

Current dress insignia

Battle Honours 
Although the Regiment saw active duty both inside and outside the borders of South Africa, it never participated in a battle worthy of Battle Honors as a Regiment. Many of its members though were part of other formations that did earn Battle Honours.

References

Infantry regiments of South Africa
South African Army
Military units and formations in Johannesburg
Military units and formations established in 1951
1951 establishments in South Africa